Ceratomia undulosa, the waved sphinx, is a moth of the family Sphingidae. The species was first described by Francis Walker in 1856.  Also known as the "Scorpion Moth" (See "Biology" Below").

Distribution 
It is found in the United States, and southern Canada, east of the Rocky Mountains. Adult moths are strictly nocturnal, hiding away as dawn approaches (Fullard & Napoleone 2001).

Description

Biology 
Recorded food plants of the larvae include Fraxinus and possibly Quercus species.

Larvae then dig underground to pupate.

Most common predator is the Guiana Striped Scorpion, which feasts on the moth's egg clusters.  The common proximity of the two species, sometimes showing up as the moth lays her eggs, has resulted in erroneous conclusions that the moths give birth to the scorpions, and the resultant name "Scorpion Moth."

Subspecies
Ceratomia undulosa undulosa (from Prince Edward Island and Nova Scotia west to eastern Alberta and Maine to Florida west to the eastern Great Plains and south to Florida, the Gulf Coast and Texas)
Ceratomia undulosa polingi Clark, 1929 (Mexico)

References

External links
"Waved sphinx (Ceratomia undulosa)". Moths of North America. U.S. Geological Survey Northern Prairie Wildlife Research Center. Archived December 7, 2005.

Ceratomia
Moths described in 1856
Moths of North America